Michael Stockton (born May 7, 1989) is an American professional basketball player for Élan Béarnais Pau-Orthez for the French Pro A. He played college basketball for the  Griffins from Westminster College. He's the second son of long time Utah Jazz Hall of Fame point guard John Stockton.

Professional career

Karlsruhe (2011–2013) 
Stockton went undrafted in the 2011 NBA draft. In July 2011, he signed his first professional contract with BG Karlsruhe of the German Pro A league.

In July 2012, Stockton joined the Utah Jazz for the 2012 NBA Summer League where he averaged 3.6 points, 1.2 rebounds and 2.0 assists in five games. He later re-joined BG Karlsruhe for the 2012–13 season.

In July 2013, Stockton re-joined the Utah Jazz for the 2013 NBA Summer League where he averaged 4.3 points and 1.3 rebounds in three games.

Riesen Ludwigsburg (2013–2015) 
On August 30, 2013, Stockton signed with MHP Riesen Ludwigsburg of the Basketball Bundesliga.

On June 10, 2014, Stockton re-signed with Riesen Ludwigsburg on a one-year deal. In July 2014, he joined the Oklahoma City Thunder for the 2014 NBA Summer League. In 28 games for Ludwigsburg in 2014–15, he averaged 8.9 points, 2.4 rebounds and 2.7 assists per game.

Canton Charge (2015–2016) 
On October 31, 2015, Stockton was selected by the Grand Rapids Drive in the second round of the 2015 NBA Development League Draft and later that night traded to the Canton Charge for Adrian Forbes.

Avtodor Saratov (2016–2017) 
After joining the Cleveland Cavaliers for the 2016 NBA Summer League, Stockton signed with Avtodor Saratov of the VTB United League on September 10, 2016. On January 23, 2017, Stockton left Avtodor Saratov.

Apollon Patras (2017) 
Stockton signed with Apollon Patras for the rest of the 2016–17 Greek Basket League season.

Göttingen (2017–2019) 
On July 14, 2017, Stockton signed a one-year contract with German Bundesliga side BG Göttingen.

Cholet Basket (2019–2021) 
Stockton signed with Cholet Basket on July 15, 2019. He averaged 12.2 points and 6.8 assists per game during the 2019-20 season (second best assist ratio of the french league 
). Stockton signed a two-year extension with the team on June 15, 2020.

Budivelnyk (2021–2022) 
On July 27, 2021, Stockton signed with Budivelnyk of the Ukrainian Basketball Super League. In February 2022, he left the team due to the Russo-Ukrainian crisis.

Champagne Basket (2022) 
On April 2, 2022, he has signed with Champagne Basket of the LNB Pro A.

Pau-Orthez (2022–present) 
On August 17, 2022, he has signed with Élan Béarnais Pau-Orthez for the French Pro A.

Personal
Stockton is the son of John and Nada Stockton. His father played 19 years for the Utah Jazz and entered the Naismith Basketball Hall of Fame in 2009. His great-grandfather, Houston Stockton, played football for Gonzaga from 1922 to 1924, going undefeated his senior year of 1924 as he earned All-America honorable mention honors. His brother, Houston, played football for University of Montana. Another brother, David, played college basketball at Gonzaga University and currently plays for the Memphis Hustle.

References

External links
Eurobasket.com Profile
RealGM.com Profile

1989 births
Living people
American expatriate basketball people in France
American expatriate basketball people in Germany
American expatriate basketball people in Greece
American expatriate basketball people in Russia
American people of Montenegrin descent
American people of Serbian descent 
American men's basketball players
American people of Croatian descent
Apollon Patras B.C. players
Basketball players from Spokane, Washington
BC Avtodor Saratov players
BG Göttingen players
BG Karlsruhe players
Canton Charge players
Champagne Châlons-Reims Basket players
Cholet Basket players
Élan Béarnais players
Gonzaga Preparatory School alumni
Point guards
Riesen Ludwigsburg players
Westminster Griffins men's basketball players